St Andrew's Church, Hittisleigh, is an Anglican parish church in Hittisleigh in Mid Devon. It is listed Grade I on the National Heritage List for England.

It was restored in 1914 and 1967. The tower dates from the late 15th century.

References

External links

St Andrew's at a Church Near You

Church of England church buildings in Devon
Diocese of Exeter
Grade I listed churches in Devon
14th-century church buildings in England